Sabad Patshahi 10 (pronunciation: , also known as the Shabad Hazare Padishah), under the title Shabad, are ten religious hymns composed by Guru Gobind Singh that are present in Dasam Granth. These hymns have comments on ritualistic practices in Sanyas, Jogis and Bairagis, and also against any form of idolatry, human or deity worship.

Description 
These hymns are primarily composed in Braj [Written In Gurmukhi] and [Punjabi] languages, with plentiful use of Sanskrit words, except sixth hymn, which is composed in Punjabi with some Persian words.
Excluding the sixth, all other hymns have three Padash and Rahau (The Pause) placed in the beginning of the Shabads.
Sixth hymn was composed at Machhiwara whereas others were composed at Anandpur Sahib. The ordering of hymns was given by Bhai Mani Singh.
The only six Ragas present in Dasam Granth are in the title of hymns.
These Shabads deal with futility of asceticism, idolatry and attachment.
Shabad Hazare is a title given to collection of these Shabads. Though it is not present in main text and the meaning is not too clear but traditionally it is believed that each Shabad has the merit of a thousand. Some scholar link the word "hazare" word to the Persian word "Hazra" (lit. present).

Hymns 
Re man aiso kar sanyasa - Raga Ramkali
Re man iha bidha jog kamao - Raga Ramkali
Prani param purakh pag lago - Raga Ramkali
Prabh ju tu keh laaj hamari - Raga Sorath
Bin kartar na kirtam mano - Raga Kalyan
Mittar pyare nu - Khayal
Kewal kal hi kartar - Raga Tilang Kaafi
So kim manas roop kahai - Raga Bilawal
Ek bin dusar na ko chinar - Raga Devgandhari
Bin har naam na bachan paayi hai -  Raga Devgandhari

References 

Dasam Granth
Indian literature